Tomas Urbonas (born 7 March 1992 in Molėtai, Lithuania) is a Lithuanian professional basketball player, who plays for center position.

International career
He won European youth gold medal while representing the Lithuanian U-16 National Team at the 2008 FIBA Europe Under-16 Championship.

Professional career
On August 29, 2015, Urbonas signed a long-term contract with the Dzūkija Alytus of LKL.

References

Living people
1992 births
Lithuanian men's basketball players
Centers (basketball)
People from Molėtai